Broadway After Dark is a 1924 American silent comedy film directed by Monta Bell and starring Adolphe Menjou, Norma Shearer, and Anna Q. Nilsson.

Plot
As described in a film magazine review, Rose Dulane, a waitress at a restaurant, is fascinated by a man to whom she confides that she is guilty of a petty theft. He is a detective and arrests her. She serves time and, upon release, finally lands a job in a minor theatrical boarding house. There she meets Ralph Norton, a well-to-do Broadway rounder, having a look at life in a less luxurious atmosphere. Norton is attracted by Rose and they attend the Actors' Equity ball. He proves to be her friend, rescues her from the detective's persecutions, and wins her love.

Cast

Box office
According to Warner Bros records the film earned $320,000 domestically and $40,000 foreign.

Preservation
With no copies of Broadway After Dark in any film archives, it is a lost film.

References

Bibliography
 Jack Jacobs & Myron Braum. The films of Norma Shearer. A. S. Barnes, 1976.

External links

Still at normashearer.com

1924 films
Films directed by Monta Bell
American silent feature films
1920s English-language films
Warner Bros. films
American black-and-white films
Lost American films
Silent American comedy films
1924 comedy films
1924 lost films
Lost comedy films
1920s American films